Donald T. Caruth (May 23, 1950 – May 1, 2010) was the minority leader of the West Virginia Senate and a former member of the West Virginia House of Delegates. He represented the 10th district, serving with Jesse O. Guills. His residence was in Athens, West Virginia, a town in Mercer County, where he died from brain cancer 22 days from his 60th birthday.

References

1950 births
2010 deaths
20th-century American lawyers
Republican Party West Virginia state senators
Republican Party members of the West Virginia House of Delegates
Deaths from brain cancer in the United States
People from Princeton, West Virginia
Concord University alumni
West Virginia University College of Law alumni
West Virginia lawyers
People from Athens, West Virginia
American United Methodists
20th-century Methodists